Newlands is a civil parish located in Hampshire, in the south east of the local government district of the City of Winchester. It is composed of the parts of the West of Waterlooville Major Development Area which lies within the City of Winchester district, and straddles the border between the wards of Denmead and of Southwick and Wickham. It was legally created on 1 April 2019, with uncontested elections taking place as part of the 2019 United Kingdom local elections, alongside the Winchester local elections. As such, the Parish as a whole is represented by nine parish councillors, including a Chair and Vice-Chair, Chair of the Planning Committee, and Chair of the Finance Committee. As part of Winchester City Council residents are represented by councillors of Newlands Parish Council, Winchester City Councillors and Hampshire county council; Winchester Southern Parishes Ward.

References 

Civil parishes in Winchester